Brechin is a town in Angus, Scotland, UK.

Brechin may also refer to:

Brechin, Brechin Beach and Brechin Point, three communities in Ramara, Ontario, Canada
Brechin (Parliament of Scotland constituency), a former burgh constituency
Brechin City F.C., a Scottish Association Football Club who play in the Scottish Professional Football League
Diocese of Brechin, a historic diocese in Scotland
Diocese of Brechin (Episcopal), an active diocese of the Scottish Episcopal Church

People with the surname
Gray Brechin, geologist, architectural historian and writer

See also 
 
 Brecheen, a surname